The 1978 Humboldt State Lumberjacks football team represented Humboldt State University during the 1978 NCAA Division II football season. Humboldt State competed in the Far Western Conference (FWC).

The 1978 Lumberjacks were led by head coach Bud Van Deren in his 13th season. They played home games at the Redwood Bowl in Arcata, California. Humboldt State finished with a record of five wins and six losses (5–6, 3–2 FWC). The Lumberjacks were outscored by their opponents 231–258 for the season.

Schedule

Notes

References

Humboldt State
Humboldt State Lumberjacks football seasons
Humboldt State Lumberjacks football